Arnulfo Betancourt (born 20 April 1972) is a Nicaraguan judoka. He competed in the men's heavyweight event at the 1996 Summer Olympics.

References

1972 births
Living people
Nicaraguan male judoka
Olympic judoka of Nicaragua
Judoka at the 1996 Summer Olympics
Place of birth missing (living people)